Lissa Lauria is an American actress and recording artist born in New York City.

Acting career
Lauria is the youngest of four siblings. She began acting at a young age appearing in local, regional and national commercials as well on the children's show Slime Time Live, The Rosie O'Donnell Show and the 2003 film The Kiss.

When Lauria was fifteen, she and her family moved to the West Coast where she landed a role in the 2009 rock musical, All Ages Night and a role in the pilot, How To Survive High School.

Lauria appeared in a segment of the TV series Style 101: Teen Edition, about Spanx and its use during the Academy Awards. Soon after, she appeared in the TV series Medium and Weeds, That same year she was a co-writer on Planet Rock: An 80's Musical, which was produced by Randy Jackson, Joe Simpson, Barney Cohen and Delora OBrien. Lauria is the lead in the upcoming comedy film Spare Change which is available on Amazon  as well as Google Play and iTunes. Lauria was a lead in the 2019 film, "Wally Got Wasted"  which is an unofficial remake of "Weekend at Bernies." It is now available on Amazon Prime.

Music career
Lauria and the Stained Pink band were invited to open for the Jonas Brothers with four original songs.

Lauria has had two of her original songs added to the teen film, Minor Details. Soon after, her song "Famous", written with The Jackie Boyz, was added to the soundtrack of pro-wrestling documentary Beyond the Mat. In Denmark, Lauria and the making of "Famous" were the focuses of a Danish reality show about making it in Hollywood.

Music producer and Musical Director for the Black Eyed Peas, Printz Board has produced music with her under his "Beets and Produce" imprint.

As of 2018, Lauria is now 1/2 of the singing/songwriting/production Pop/Rock/Americana duo, Fox & Lauria with musical prodigy, Isaac Fox. They appeared at CMAfest 2018 & 2019  in Nashville.

Music videos
"Famous" (2011)
"Girlfriend" (2012)
"Boys and Girls" (2013)
"One Day" (2014)

Filmography

The Rosie O'Donnell Show (2002)
Slime Time Live (2002)
The Kiss (2003)
Minor Details (2009)
All Ages Night (2009)
Caesar and Otto's Summer Camp Massacre (2009)
How To Survive High School (2010)
Style 101: Teen Edition (2010)
Medium (tv series) (2011)
Weeds (tv series) (2011)
Beyond the Mat (2012)
Spare Change (2014) 
Wally Got Wasted (2019)

References

External links
 
 

American television actresses
Living people
21st-century American actresses
American film actresses
American child actresses
Actresses from New York City
American women singers
Singers from New York City
Year of birth missing (living people)